(Terpyridine)ruthenium trichloride is the coordination complex with the formula RuCl3(terpy), where terpy is terpyridine.  It is a brown paramagnetic solid that is a precursor to other complexes of ruthenium, mainly by substitution of the chloride ligands.  The complex has octahedral geometry.  It is prepared by heating ruthenium trichloride with a DMF solution of terpyridine.

References

Ruthenium complexes
Chloro complexes
Pyridine complexes
Ruthenium(III) compounds